The Crusades: An Arab Perspective is a four-part series produced by Al Jazeera English, which first aired in December 2016. It presents the dramatic story of the medieval religious war through an Arab point of view. The series provides a new perspective on the history of the Crusades for a global, English-speaking audience, that has largely read about or studied the famous struggle from a primarily Christian and Western point of view. The series is heavily influenced by the 1984 book The Crusades Through Arab Eyes, by Amin Maalouf.

The series starts with the Catholic church council in Clermont in France in 1095, under Pope Urban II, and continues to the fall of Acre, the last Crusader foothold in the east, in 1291, covering two centuries of bloody battles, massacres, and conquering and reconquering of territories, including Jerusalem. The story also involves many famous names – Saladin, Richard I of England, Frederick II and Louis IX.

Episodes 
Following is the complete list of episodes:

References

External links
The Crusades: An Arab Perspective
Al Jazeera Documentaries

Al Jazeera
Documentaries about historical events
Documentary television series about war
Television series about the Crusades
Medieval documentaries
Saladin
2016 television series debuts
2016 television series endings